Rik Simpson (a.k.a. Rikademus) is a multi Grammy Award-winning British record producer, sound engineer, musician, and songwriter. He is most recently recognised for his production work with Coldplay on Viva la Vida or Death and All His Friends (2008), Mylo Xyloto (2011), Ghost Stories (2014), A Head Full of Dreams (2015), Kaleidoscope EP (2017) and Everyday Life (2019). He has also gained critical acclaim for his work with Jay-Z, Portishead, Kasabian, Black Rebel Motorcycle Club and PJ Harvey. In addition to the technical sides of recording and mixing, he often contributes musically, playing and singing on many of his productions.

Simpson is also one half of production duo The Darktones, with Coldplay bassist Guy Berryman.

Production credits

Rik Simpson

 Morning Runner – "Gone Up in Flames" (single, 2005)
 Jay-Z feat. Chris Martin – "Beach Chair" (song, 2006)
 Some Velvet Morning – Silence Will Kill You (2007)
 Chris Martin - Carnival II: Memoirs of an Immigrant (2007)
 Coldplay – Viva la Vida or Death and All His Friends (2008)
 Coldplay – Prospekt's March (EP, 2008)
 Coldplay – LeftRightLeftRightLeft (2009)
 Natalie Imbruglia – Come to Life (2009)
 Coldplay – Mylo Xyloto (2011)
 Coldplay – "Atlas" (single, 2013)
 Coldplay – Ghost Stories (2014)
 Coldplay - A Head Full Of Dreams (2015)
 Coldplay - Kaleidoscope (EP, 2017)
 Coldplay - Everyday Life (2019)
 Coldplay - Music of the Spheres (2021)

The Darktones
 The Pierces – Love You More (EP, 2010)
 The Pierces – You & I (2011)

Awards and nominations

Grammy Awards

|-
| rowspan="2" style="text-align:center;"| 2009
| rowspan="2"| Viva la Vida or Death and All His Friends
| Best Rock Album
| 
|-
| Album of the Year
| 
|-
| style="text-align:center;"| 2013
| Mylo Xyloto
| Best Rock Album
| 
|-
| style="text-align:center;"| 2021
| Everyday Life
| Album of the Year
| 
|-

References

External links
 

Year of birth missing (living people)
Place of birth missing (living people)
Living people
British record producers
Grammy Award winners